Witzel may refer to:

People with the surname
 Vicelinus (c. 1090–1154), theologian and bishop of Oldenburg
  (1879-1929), American photograph
  (1847–1906), German dentist
 Frank Witzel (born 1955), German writer, musician
  (born 1932), German motorcycle racer
 Georg Witzel (1501–1573), German theologian
 Michael Witzel (born 1943), German-American philologist
 Morgen Witzel (born 1960), Canadian historian and business theorist
  (1856–1925), German physician
  (born 1972), German politician
  (born 1949), German politician
 Wilson Witzel (born 1968), governor of the Rio de Janeiro, Brazil

Other uses
German name of Vețel, Romania